The Mátra  is a mountain range in northern Hungary, between the towns Gyöngyös and Eger. The country's highest peak, Kékestető (1014 m), belongs to this mountain range.

The Mátra is part of the North Hungarian Mountains and belongs by origin to the largest young volcanic zone of Europe. It is situated between the valleys of the River Tarna and River Zagyva. The Mátra divided into the Western Mátra, Central Mátra and the Eastern Mátra. The highest point of the Western Mátra is Muzsla (805 m). The Central Mátra consists of the plateau of Mátrabérc (Mátra Ridge) and the groups of the volcanic cones of Galya-tető (964 m) and Kékes (1014 m). Steep, rugged slopes, screes, talus slopes and slides alternate with one another, covered with closed beech forests. Gentler slopes and parallel valleys flow down to the south, the largest of which is the so-called Nagy-völgy ("Great valley"). The 'main entrance' to the Mátra was formed in parallel with the valley of Nagy-patak ("Great stream"), ranging from Mátrafüred to Mátraháza. From the vineyard-covered landscape of the foot of the Mátra travellers can arrive at the wooded mountains in a flash. To the east, after the steep escarpment of the 898-meter-high Sas-kő ("Eagle stone"), the 650–750-meter-high peaks of the Eastern Mátra follow one another. The northern part of the mountain range is called Mátralába ("the Mátra's feet"). This is a hilly area covered with 250–400-meter-high small volcanic cones, with mostly cultivated arable lands.

Regional structure

Cities/towns
 Gyöngyös (including Mátrafüred, Mátraháza and Kékestető)
 Pásztó (including Hasznos and Mátrakeresztes)
 Pétervására
 Bátonyterenye (including Nagybátony, Kisterenye, Maconka, Szúpatak and Szorospatak)

See also
Geography of Hungary
North Hungarian Mountains
1513 Mátra

External links

Mátra Home
Gallery

Extinct volcanoes
Mountain ranges of Hungary
Mountain ranges of the Western Carpathians
Ski areas and resorts in Hungary
Volcanoes of Hungary